Aulacopodus is a genus of beetles in the family Carabidae, containing the following species:

 Aulacopodus brouni (Csiki 1930)
 Aulacopodus calathoides (Broun 1886)
 Aulacopodus maorinus (Bates 1874)
 Aulacopodus sharpianus (Broun 1893)

References

Pterostichinae